Khurshid Uddin Ahmed (died 22 April 2013) was a Bangladesh Army Brigadier General who served in the Bangladesh Liberation War in 1971. He was posthumously awarded the Independence Day Award in 2021.

Background
Ahmed was a student of Dhaka Medical College during the Bengali language movement in 1952.

Ahmed was an accuse in the 1968 Agartala Conspiracy Case.

References

1930s births
2013 deaths
Bangladesh Army generals
Recipients of the Independence Day Award